Ellen Gunhilde Hørup (29 December 1871 – 25 March 1953) was a Danish journalist and non-fiction writer. She wrote extensively in several languages including English in support of peace, improvements in childcare, and women's rights. Hørup was also an active supporter of Mahatma Gandhi, working with him for a time.

Biography
Born in Copenhagen, Hørup grew up in a rather radical home for the times as her mother continued to teach rather than raise her daughter at home while her father, the politician Viggo Hørup, was known for his pacificism. Although she trained as a dentist, graduating in both Denmark (1893) and France (1894), she only practised for a short period of training practice.

In 1886, she married the lawyer Vilhelm Nielsen who soon became a leading player at the newspaper Politiken. For a number of years, she continued virtually unnoticed, except for adding to her emancipated reputation by becoming the first female rower and racing cyclist in Denmark. In her early forties, she began work as a translator, producing an Italian version of Hans Christian Andersen's fairly tales. In 1912, she published her first articles in Tilskueren before joining Politikken as a translator. It was not until 1927 that she published the first of a series of long editorial articles in the paper. Thanks to her excellent knowledge of English, Russian and Italian, she is thought to be the first Danish woman who wrote articles on international politics before the Second World War. In 1930, she founded Indiens Venner (Friends of India) together with a journal bearing the same name, reflecting branches of Friends of India organizations around the world. In 1932, she established The International Committee for India which held a number of conferences in Geneva.

She was financially independent after the death of her mother 
as she inherited shares in the paper her father had started. Continuing her father's work, she was an active supporter of the Indian Congress Party and Mahatma Gandhi. Together with the ceramic artist Cathinca Olsen and the Norwegian singer Bokken Lasson, she worked with Gandhi in the 1920s and 1930s.

Following a quiet period during the war, she resumed editorial writing in 1949, criticizing in particular the lack of organized child care in Denmark and the unsatisfactory conditions in homes for children. She founded a children's home of her own and became a member of the Danish branch of the Fédération Démocratique Internationale des Femmes, now known as Danmarks Demokratiske Kvindeforbund.

Selected works
 Gandhis Indien, 1931
 Magtens Vej, 1936
 Politik og Krig, 1937
 Hvorfor faar vi Krig?, 1938
 Hvordan Freden reddes, 1939
 Der er kun en Krig, 1946
 Kapitalisme, kommunisme og krig, 1949

See also
List of peace activists

References

1871 births
1953 deaths
People from Copenhagen
Danish women journalists
Danish pacifists
Pacifist feminists
20th-century Danish writers
20th-century Danish women writers